Doron Tamir  is a former top intelligence officer of the Israel Defense Forces who participated in the founding of the Israel National Cyber Bureau (INCB) in the office of the Prime Minister of Israel.

Military and intelligence career
In the INCB, Tamir was Senior Director of the Security Sector and also Head of International Cooperation. Among his roles in the INCB, he led the establishment of Israel National Security Operations Center (SOC). Formerly, Tamir served as the IDF Chief Intelligence Officer holding the rank of Brigadier General.

Following his retirement from the INCB, Tamir co-founded Security Group, where he serves as chairman. At Cyber Security Group, Tamir oversees the firm's work with governments around the world in developing National Cyber Security Strategies (NSCS) and related projects.

References

External links 
Israel National Cyber Bureau (INCB) oversees the national efforts of Israel in cyber security, including the newly formed National Cyber Authority and the [https://cert.gov.il/CERT-IL/Pages/CERT-IL.aspx Israel National CERT.
Cyber Security Group
Israel National Cyber Bureau (INCB) in the Prime Minister Office.
 International Experts: Cyber Threats Are Not As Scary As You Think" - General Tamir speaks at a conference by Georgetown University Institute for Law, Science and Global Security on the topic of "INTERNATIONAL ENGAGEMENT ON CYBER: DEVELOPING INTERNATIONAL NORMS FOR A SAFE, STABLE & PREDICTABLE CYBER ENVIRONMENT".
Israel’s New National Cyber Operations Center (National Security Operations Center N-SOC).
 Cyber Security Group team bios.
Doron Tamir LinkedIn profile.

Israeli generals
Living people
Year of birth missing (living people)
Weapon designers